83 and 85 Sullivan Street are on Sullivan Street between Broome Street and Spring Street in Manhattan, New York. They are the two surviving Federal style rowhouses on this location, which was at one point part of the Bayard farm.

History 
The two houses were built in 1819. They were designated as landmarks by the Landmarks Preservation Commission on May 15, 1973.

See also
National Register of Historic Places listings in New York County, New York
List of New York City Designated Landmarks in Manhattan

References

External links 
Forgotten-ny.com

Federal architecture in New York City
Houses completed in 1819
Houses on the National Register of Historic Places in Manhattan
New York City Designated Landmarks in Manhattan
SoHo, Manhattan